Hotelier is a 2001 South Korean television drama series set in Seoul Hotel, a fictional five-star hotel undergoing an expensive expansion and renovation. The word "hotelier" means "a person who owns or runs a hotel."

Starring Bae Yong-joon, Song Yoon-ah, Kim Seung-woo and Song Hye-kyo, it aired on MBC from April 4 to July 7, 2001, on Wednesdays and Thursdays at 21:55 for 20 episodes. Bae's character is based on Korean-American businessman Hong Seung-pyo.

Synopsis
President Choi, hotelier of Seoul Hotel, dies from a heart attack hours after his old friend Kim Bok-man informed him that his company Hankang Distribution was buying shares of Seoul Hotel in preparation of a takeover. Choi is succeeded by his wife, Yoon Bong-sook, who had never assumed any managerial position in the hotel before. Her son, Choi Young-jae is a dissolute young man who refuses to work and spends all his time partying.

To fend off the competitor, Madam Yoon sends one of the hotel employees, Seo Jin-young, to America to try to rehire Seoul Hotel's former hotel manager, Han Tae-jun, who was forced to resign after a scandal despite his innocence. Tae-jun is currently taking care of Jenny, a drug-addicted Korean-American girl.

To assist him in buying Seoul Hotel's shares through whatever means possible, Bok-man hires Frank Shin (aka Shin Dong-hyuk), a wealthy Korean-American lawyer, businessman, and mergers and acquisitions specialist.

Frank only agrees to take the job after meeting Jin-young in America and being fascinated by her. Traveling to Seoul for the first time since he left the country as a child, Frank and his loyal business assistant Leo move into a chalet at the Seoul Hotel to better conduct their secret business deal.

Through Frank's double dealings, Bok-man learns of Seoul Hotel's mismanagement problems. But Frank finds himself falling in love with Jin-young, and Jin-young feels torn between him and her old friend and colleague Tae-jun.

Meanwhile, Young-jae falls for Kim Yoon-hee, melancholic heiress and Bok-man's daughter, after meeting her at a nightclub. But Yoon-hee is attracted to the kind and mature Tae-jun, whom she'd encountered at a birthday party held at Seoul Hotel.

Tae-jun is weighed down by his numerous responsibilities: defending the hotel from its competitors, protecting Yoon-hee from her abusive father, preventing Jin-young from falling in love with the suspicious Frank, and helping Young-jae mend his ways.

Frank soon discovers that Jenny, whom Tae-jun had rescued, is his biological sister. Together, they go to see their father, who calls them by their Korean names, Dong-hyuk and Dong-hee. His reconciliation with his family and love for Jin-young results in a change of heart for Frank, and he decides to switch sides and help Seoul Hotel.

Tae-jun and Frank work together and succeed in re-establishing Seoul Hotel's reputation as a top hotel. Bong-sook is diagnosed with cancer and dies. Frank and Jin-young get engaged. Yoon-hee goes to Las Vegas to study business, and Tae-jun follows her abroad; in a scene after the ending credits, Tae-jun and Yoon-hee are shown reuniting on a highway road.

Cast 
 Bae Yong-joon - Frank Shin / Shin Dong-hyuk 
 Song Yoon-ah - Seo Jin-young
 Kim Seung-woo - Han Tae-jun, hotel manager
 Song Hye-kyo - Kim Yoon-hee
 Youn Yuh-jung - Yoon Bong-sook, hotel owner
 Park Jung-chul - Choi Young-jae, son of Yoon Bong-sook
 Joo Hyun - President Choi
 Han Jin-hee - Kim Bok-man, chairman of Hankang distribution
 Choi Hwa-jung - Lee Soon-jung, housekeeping manager
 Huh Joon-ho - Oh Hyung-man
 Choi Yong-min - Leo Park, Frank's business partner
 Kim In-moon - Shin Jang-hae, Dong-hyuk's father
 Kim Na-rae - Jenny / Shin Dong-hee
 Myung Gye-nam - head chef 
 Lee Gae-in - Manager Yoo
 Yoon Yong-hyun - Guard Jung
 Kang Ji Woo - bellboy Hyun-chul
 Lee Jung-yong - Assistant chef Lee Gap-seu
 Kim Yong-hee
 Yeo Hyun-soo
 Ahn Hye Ran - Eun Joo, Yoon-hee's best friend
 Shin Shin-ae as Shin Geum-soon
 Kim Hee-jung

Awards and nominations

Notes

References

External links 
 Hotelier official MBC website 
 
 

MBC TV television dramas
2001 South Korean television series debuts
2001 South Korean television series endings
Korean-language television shows
Television series set in hotels
Television shows written by Kang Eun-kyung
South Korean romance television series
South Korean television series remade in other languages